Colbert House may refer to:

Colbert House (Gibsland, Louisiana), listed on the National Register of Historic Places in Louisiana
Colbert House (Ilwaco, Washington), listed on the National Register of Historic Places in Washington